Naphthalene is an organic compound with formula . It is the simplest polycyclic aromatic hydrocarbon, and is a white crystalline solid with a characteristic odor that is detectable at concentrations as low as 0.08 ppm by mass. As an aromatic hydrocarbon, naphthalene's structure consists of a fused pair of benzene rings. It is best known as the main ingredient of traditional mothballs.

History
In the early 1820s, two separate reports described a white solid with a pungent odor derived from the distillation of coal tar. In 1821, John Kidd cited these two disclosures and then described many of this substance's properties and the means of its production. He proposed the name naphthaline, as it had been derived from a kind of naphtha (a broad term encompassing any volatile, flammable liquid hydrocarbon mixture, including coal tar). Naphthalene's chemical formula was determined by Michael Faraday in 1826. The structure of two fused benzene rings was proposed by Emil Erlenmeyer in 1866, and confirmed by Carl Gräbe three years later.

Physical properties
A naphthalene molecule can be viewed as the fusion of a pair of benzene rings. (In organic chemistry, rings are fused if they share two or more atoms.) As such, naphthalene is classified as a benzenoid polycyclic aromatic hydrocarbon (PAH).

The eight carbon atoms that are not shared by the two rings carry one hydrogen atom each. For purpose of the standard IUPAC nomenclature of derived compounds, those eight atoms are numbered 1 through 8 in sequence around the perimeter of the molecule, starting with a carbon atom adjacent to a shared one. The shared carbon atoms are labeled 4a (between 4 and 5) and 8a (between 8 and 1).

Molecular geometry
The molecule is planar, like benzene. Unlike benzene, the carbon–carbon bonds in naphthalene are not of the same length. The bonds C1−C2, C3−C4, C5−C6 and C7−C8 are about 1.37 Å (137 pm) in length, whereas the other carbon–carbon bonds are about 1.42 Å (142 pm) long. This difference, established by X-ray diffraction, is consistent with the valence bond model in naphthalene and in particular, with the theorem of cross-conjugation. This theorem would describe naphthalene as an aromatic benzene unit bonded to a diene but not extensively conjugated to it (at least in the ground state), which is consistent with two of its three resonance structures.

Because of this resonance, the molecule has bilateral symmetry across the plane of the shared carbon pair, as well as across the plane that bisects bonds C2-C3 and C6-C7, and across the plane of the carbon atoms. Thus there are two sets of equivalent hydrogen atoms: the alpha positions, numbered 1, 4, 5, and 8, and the beta positions, 2, 3, 6, and 7. Two isomers are then possible for mono-substituted naphthalenes, corresponding to substitution at an alpha or beta position. 

Structural isomers of naphthalene that have two fused aromatic rings include azulene, which has a 5–7 fused ring system, and Bicyclo[6.2.0]decapentaene which has a fused 4–8 ring system.

The point group symmetry of naphthalene is D2h.

Electrical conductivity
Pure crystalline naphthalene is a moderate insulator at room temperature, with resistivity of about 1012 Ω m. The resistivity drops more than a thousandfold on melting, to about 4 × 108 Ω m. Both in the liquid and in the solid, the resistivity depends on temperature as ρ = ρ0 exp(E/(k T)), where ρ0 (Ω m) and E (eV) are constant parameters, k is Boltzmann's constant (8.617×10−5 eV/K), and T is absolute temperature (K). The parameter E is 0.73 in the solid. However, the solid shows semiconducting character below 100 K.

Chemical properties

Reactions with electrophiles
In electrophilic aromatic substitution reactions, naphthalene reacts more readily than benzene. For example, chlorination and bromination of naphthalene proceeds without a catalyst to give 1-chloronaphthalene and 1-bromonaphthalene, respectively. Likewise, whereas both benzene and naphthalene can be alkylated using Friedel–Crafts reactions, naphthalene can also be easily alkylated by reaction with alkenes or alcohols, using sulfuric or phosphoric acid catalysts.

In terms of regiochemistry, electrophiles attack at the alpha position. The selectivity for alpha over beta substitution can be rationalized in terms of the resonance structures of the intermediate: for the alpha substitution intermediate, seven resonance structures can be drawn, of which four preserve an aromatic ring. For beta substitution, the intermediate has only six resonance structures, and only two of these are aromatic. Sulfonation gives the "alpha" product naphthalene-1-sulfonic acid as the kinetic product but naphthalene-2-sulfonic acid as the thermodynamic product. The 1-isomer forms predominantly at 25 °C, and the 2-isomer at 160 °C.
Sulfonation to give the 1- and 2-sulfonic acid occurs readily:
  +  →  + 
Further sulfonation give di-, tri-, and tetrasulfonic acids.

Lithiation
Analogous to the synthesis of phenyllithium is the conversion of 1-bromonaphthalene to 1-lithionaphthalene, by lithium–halogen exchange:
C10H7Br  +  BuLi   →    C10H7Li  +  BuBr
The resulting lithionaphthalene undergoes a second lithiation, in contrast to the behavior of phenyllithium. These 1,8-dilithio derivatives are precursors to a host of peri-naphthalene derivatives.

Reduction and oxidation
With alkali metals, naphthalene forms the dark blue-green radical anion salts such as sodium naphthalene, Na+C10H. The naphthalene anions are strong reducing agents.

Naphthalene can be hydrogenated under high pressure in the presence of metal catalysts to give 1,2,3,4-tetrahydronaphthalene(), also known as tetralin. Further hydrogenation yields decahydronaphthalene or decalin.

C10H8  +  4.5 O2   →   C6H4(CO)2O  +  2 CO2  +  2 H2O
This reaction is the basis of the main use of naphthalene. Oxidation can also be effected using conventional stoichiometric chromate or permanganate reagents.

Production

Most naphthalene is derived from coal tar. From the 1960s until the 1990s, significant amounts of naphthalene were also produced from heavy petroleum fractions during petroleum refining, but present-day production is mainly from coal tar. Approximately 1.3M tons are produced annually.

Naphthalene is the most abundant single component of coal tar. The composition of coal tar varies with coal type and processing, but typical coal tar is about 10% naphthalene by weight. In industrial practice, distillation of coal tar yields an oil containing about 50% naphthalene, along with twelve other aromatic compounds. This oil, after being washed with aqueous sodium hydroxide to remove acidic components (chiefly various phenols), and with sulfuric acid to remove basic components, undergoes fractional distillation to isolate naphthalene. The crude naphthalene resulting from this process is about 95% naphthalene by weight. The chief impurities are the sulfur-containing aromatic compound benzothiophene (< 2%), indane (0.2%), indene (< 2%), and methylnaphthalene (< 2%). Petroleum-derived naphthalene is usually purer than that derived from coal tar. Where required, crude naphthalene can be further purified by recrystallization from any of a variety of solvents, resulting in 99% naphthalene by weight, referred to as 80 °C (melting point).

In North America, the coal tar producers are Koppers Inc., Ruetgers Canada Inc. and Recochem Inc., and the primary petroleum producer is Monument Chemical Inc. In Western Europe the well-known producers are Koppers, Ruetgers, and Deza. In Eastern Europe, naphthalene is produced by a variety of integrated metallurgy complexes (Severstal, Evraz, Mechel, MMK) in Russia, dedicated naphthalene and phenol makers INKOR, Yenakievsky Metallurgy plant in Ukraine and ArcelorMittal Temirtau in Kazakhstan.

Other sources and occurrences
Naphthalene and its alkyl homologs are the major constituents of creosote.

Trace amounts of naphthalene are produced by magnolias and some species of deer, as well as the Formosan subterranean termite, possibly produced by the termite as a repellant against "ants, poisonous fungi and nematode worms." Some strains of the endophytic fungus Muscodor albus produce naphthalene among a range of volatile organic compounds, while Muscodor vitigenus produces naphthalene almost exclusively.

Uses
Naphthalene is used mainly as a precursor to derivative chemicals. The single largest use of naphthalene is the industrial production of phthalic anhydride, although more phthalic anhydride is made from o-xylene.

Fumigant
Naphthalene has been used as a fumigant. It was once the primary ingredient in mothballs, although its use has largely been replaced in favor of alternatives such as 1,4-dichlorobenzene. In a sealed container containing naphthalene pellets, naphthalene vapors build up to levels toxic to both the adult and larval forms of many moths that attack textiles. Other fumigant uses of naphthalene include use in soil as a fumigant pesticide, in attic spaces to repel insects and animals such as opossums, and in museum storage-drawers and cupboards to protect the contents from attack by insect pests.

Solvent
Molten naphthalene provides an excellent solubilizing medium for poorly soluble aromatic compounds. In many cases it is more efficient than other high-boiling solvents, such as dichlorobenzene, benzonitrile, nitrobenzene and durene. The reaction of C60 with anthracene is conveniently conducted in refluxing naphthalene to give the 1:1 Diels–Alder adduct. The aromatization of hydroporphyrins has been achieved using a solution of DDQ in naphthalene.

Derivative uses
The single largest use of naphthalene is the production of phthalic anhydride, which is an intermediate used to make plasticizers for polyvinyl chloride, and to make alkyd resin polymers used in paints and varnishes.

Sulfonic acids and sulfonates
Many naphthalenesulfonic acids and sulfonates are useful. Naphthalenesulfonic acids are used in the synthesis of 1-naphthol and 2-naphthol, precursors for various dyestuffs, pigments, rubber processing chemicals and other chemicals and pharmaceuticals. They are also used as dispersants in synthetic and natural rubbers, in agricultural pesticides, in dyes, and in lead–acid battery plates. Naphthalenedisulfonic acids such as Armstrong's acid are used as precursors and to form pharmaceutical salts such as CFT.

The aminonaphthalenesulfonic acids are precursors for synthesis of many synthetic dyes.

Alkyl naphthalene sulfonates (ANS) are used in many industrial applications as nondetergent surfactants (wetting agents) that effectively disperse colloidal systems in aqueous media. The major commercial applications are in the agricultural chemical industry, which uses ANS for wettable powder and wettable granular (dry-flowable) formulations, and in the textile and fabric industry, which uses the wetting and defoaming properties of ANS for bleaching and dyeing operations.

Some naphthalenesulfonate polymers are superplasticizers used for the production of high strength concrete. They are produced by treating naphthalenesulfonic acid with formaldehyde, followed by neutralization with sodium hydroxide or calcium hydroxide.

Other derivative uses

Many azo dyes are produced from naphthalene. Useful agrichemicals include naphthoxyacetic acids.

Hydrogenation of naphthalene gives tetrahydronaphthalene (tetralin) and decahydronaphthalene (decalin), which are used as low-volatility solvents. Tetralin is used as a hydrogen-donor solvent.

Alkylation of naphthalene with propylene gives a mixture of diisopropylnaphthalenes, which are useful as nonvolatile liquids for inks.

Substituted napthalenes serve as pharmaceuticals such as propranolol (a beta blocker) and nabumetone (a nonsteroidal anti-inflammatory drug).

Other uses
Several uses stem from naphthalene's high volatility: it is used to create artificial pores in the manufacture of high-porosity grinding wheels; it is used in engineering studies of heat transfer using mass sublimation; and it has been explored as a sublimable propellant for cold gas satellite thrusters.

Health effects
Exposure to large amounts of naphthalene may damage or destroy red blood cells, most commonly in people with the inherited condition known as glucose-6-phosphate dehydrogenase (G6PD) deficiency, which over 400 million people suffer from. Humans, in particular children, have developed the condition known as hemolytic anemia, after ingesting mothballs or deodorant blocks containing naphthalene. Symptoms include fatigue, lack of appetite, restlessness, and pale skin. Exposure to large amounts of naphthalene may cause confusion, nausea, vomiting, diarrhea, blood in the urine, and jaundice (yellow coloration of the skin due to dysfunction of the liver).

The US National Toxicology Program (NTP) held an experiment where male and female rats and mice were exposed to naphthalene vapors on weekdays for two years. Both male and female rats exhibited evidence of carcinogenesis with increased incidences of adenoma and neuroblastoma of the nose. Female mice exhibited some evidence of carcinogenesis based on increased incidences of alveolar and bronchiolar adenomas of the lung, while male mice exhibited no evidence of carcinogenesis.

The International Agency for Research on Cancer (IARC) classifies naphthalene as possibly carcinogenic to humans and animals (Group 2B). The IARC also points out that acute exposure causes cataracts in humans, rats, rabbits, and mice; and that hemolytic anemia (described above) can occur in children and infants after oral or inhalation exposure or after maternal exposure during pregnancy. Under California's Proposition 65, naphthalene is listed as "known to the State to cause cancer". A probable mechanism for the carcinogenic effects of mothballs and some types of air fresheners containing naphthalene has been identified.

Regulation
US government agencies have set occupational exposure limits to naphthalene exposure. The Occupational Safety and Health Administration has set a permissible exposure limit at 10 ppm (50 mg/m3) over an eight-hour time-weighted average. The National Institute for Occupational Safety and Health has set a recommended exposure limit at 10 ppm (50 mg/m3) over an eight-hour time-weighted average, as well as a short-term exposure limit at 15 ppm (75 mg/m3). Naphthalene's minimum odor threshold is 0.084 ppm for humans.

Mothballs and other products containing naphthalene have been banned within the EU since 2008.

In China, the use of naphthalene in mothballs is forbidden. Danger to human health and the common use of natural camphor are cited as reasons for the ban.

Naphthalene derivatives 
The partial list of naphthalene derivatives includes the following compounds:

See also
Camphor
Dialin, Tetralin, Decalin
List of interstellar and circumstellar molecules
Mothballs
1-Naphthol, 2-Naphthol
Sodium naphthalenide
Wagner-Jauregg reaction (classic naphthalene synthesis)

References

External links

Naphthalene—National Pesticide Information Center
Naphthalene—EPA Air Toxics Web Site
Naphthalene (PIM 363)—mostly on toxicity of naphthalene
Naphthalene—CDC – NIOSH Pocket Guide to Chemical Hazards

Naphthalenes
Antiseptics
Hazardous air pollutants
IARC Group 2B carcinogens
Insecticides
Simple aromatic rings